The Witch in the Window is a 2018 American supernatural horror film, written and directed by Andy Mitton. The film premiered on 23 July 2018 at Fantasia International Film Festival.

Plot
It all started when a father and his twelve-year-old son arrived in rural Vermont to restore an old mansion. Soon they start seeing an ugly witch oftentimes displayed in the windows. The witch is the evil spirit of the former house owner; she is not happy with the new residents, so she tries to drive them out of the property by any means possible. The man and his teenage son initially do not pay attention to the evil ghost, but the further they progress in repairing the mansion, the stronger and more dangerous the ghost becomes. A local tells that many years ago, a real witch, Lydia, lived in the house with her husband and son, both of whom died mysteriously.

Cast
Arija Bareikis as Beverly
Alex Draper as Simon
Charlie Tacker as Finn
Carol Stanzione as Lydia
Greg Naughton as Louis
Zach Jette as Louis' Son

Reception
The Witch in the Window received mixed to positive reviews from critics.

Kalyn Corrigan of Bloody Disgusting! wrote, "Atmospheric, unsettling, and creepy as hell, The Witch in the Window is one of the most exciting horror movies of the year. The tangible, believable chemistry shared between talented actors Draper and Tacker who play father and son help the audience establish a strong bond with the characters that makes their situation seem all the more perilous when the two are put in danger. It’s hard not to root for the pair to make it out alive, to re-establish their familial structure, and to banish the ghost from their new property – and because of this, it feels all the more heartbreaking each time life swats them down and puts them in their place." Matt Donato of /Film commented, "The Witch In The Window is a harrowing, scorchingly poignant and devastating glimpse into societal fears that have redefined family dinner conversations." Anton Bitel of Sight & Sound added, "Mitton's film never goes where you expect, while deploying its horror tropes to show the cracks and fissures in contemporary America's nuclear family structure. Its ending, so poignantly bittersweet, is very hard-earned..."

References

External links
 
 

2018 films
2018 horror films
American supernatural horror films
2010s English-language films
2010s American films